Flight 2311 may refer to:

 CAAC Flight 2311, aviation accident of an Ilyushin Il-18 in 1982
 Atlantic Southeast Airlines Flight 2311 aviation accident of an Embraer EMB-120 Brasilia in 1991

2311